The 2004 West Coast Conference men's basketball tournament took place March 5–8, 2004. All rounds were held in Santa Clara, California at the Leavey Center. The semifinals were televised by ESPN2. The West Coast Conference Championship Game was televised by ESPN.

The Gonzaga Bulldogs earned their sixth WCC Tournament title and an automatic bid to the 2004 NCAA tournament. Ronny Turiaf of Gonzaga was named Tournament MVP.

Bracket

See also 
West Coast Conference

References

Tournament
West Coast Conference men's basketball tournament
West Coast Athletic Conference men's basketball tournament
West Coast Athletic Conference men's basketball tournament